Heaven & Hell is a compilation album by American singer Meat Loaf and Welsh singer Bonnie Tyler. It was released in 1989 by Telstar Records. The majority of songs included on Heaven & Hell were written by Jim Steinman, who wrote some of Meat Loaf and Tyler's biggest hits.

Though the album was not an immediate commercial success, due to steady sales Heaven & Hell was certified platinum by the BPI in 2013.

Background 
Heaven & Hell was first released in 1989 by Telstar following a deal with Epic. It contains fourteen tracks, with selections from Bat Out of Hell, Dead Ringer, Blind Before I Stop and Bad Attitude by Meat Loaf, and Faster Than the Speed of Night and Secret Dreams and Forbidden Fire by Bonnie Tyler. Ten of the compilation's tracks were written by Jim Steinman. The original cover art for Heaven & Hell featured two mirrored photographs of Meat Loaf and Tyler performing on stage. In 1993, Columbia reissued the compilation with a new cover art and altered track listing.

In 2011, Sony released another CD pressing of Heaven & Hell as part of their "Girl's Night In X" reissue campaign.

Critical reception 
Thom Jurek of AllMusic described the compilation as "a rather pointless collection of tunes", only that it was "a good idea at the time". He described Steinman's songs as "brilliantly composed" and Meat Loaf's vocals as "wonderfully sung".

Track listing

Charts

Certifications

Release history

References 

1989 compilation albums
Meat Loaf albums
Bonnie Tyler compilation albums